Route 913, or Highway 913, may refer to:

Canada
Saskatchewan Highway 913

Costa Rica
 National Route 913

India
National Highway 913 (NH 913) is the notified number of the proposed Arunachal Frontier Highway in Arunachal Pradesh state, near the McMahon Line frontier with China.

United Kingdom
 A913 road

United States